Osternienburg station is a railway station in the municipality of Osternienburg, located in the Anhalt-Bitterfeld district in Saxony-Anhalt, Germany.

References

Railway stations in Saxony-Anhalt
Buildings and structures in Anhalt-Bitterfeld